Regional autonomy is decentralization of governance to outlying regions. Recent examples of disputes over autonomy include:

 The Basque region of Spain
 The Catalan region of Spain
 The Sicilia region of Italy
 The disputes over autonomy of provinces in Indonesia.

Current examples of autonomous regions include the Guangxi Zhuang Autonomous Region in China and the Cherokee Nation in the United States.

See also 

 Autonomous administrative division
 Regionalisation
 Regionalism

External links
Regional Autonomy in Indonesia: How to Make Decentralization Work

Politics
Autonomy
Decentralization